Jan Koum (born Yan Borysovych Kum, on February 24, 1976) is a Ukrainian-American billionaire businessman and computer programmer. He is the co-founder and former CEO of WhatsApp, a mobile messaging app which was acquired by Facebook in 2014 for US$19.3 billion. According to Forbes, he has an estimated net worth of US$13.8 billion as of September 2022, making him one of the richest people in the world. He entered the Forbes list of the 400 richest Americans in 2014 at No. 62, with an estimated net worth of $7.5 billion, the highest-ranked newcomer to the list that year.

Early life
Koum was born in Kyiv, then in the Ukrainian SSR, on February 24, 1976. He grew up in Fastiv. In 1992, at the age of 16, he moved with his mother and grandmother to Mountain View, California. A social support program helped the family get a small two-bedroom apartment there. His father had intended to join the family later, but he never left Ukraine and died in 1997. Koum and his mother remained in touch with his father until his death. At first, his mother worked as a babysitter while he worked as a cleaner at a grocery store. His mother died in 2000 after a long battle with cancer.

Career
By the age of 18, Koum had become interested in computer programming. He enrolled at San Jose State University and simultaneously worked at Ernst & Young as a security tester. He also joined w00w00, a computer security think tank started in 1996, where he met future Napster creators Shawn Fanning and Jordan Ritter.

In 1997, Koum met Brian Acton while working at Ernst & Young. Later that year, he was hired by Yahoo! as an infrastructure engineer. He quit school shortly thereafter. Over the next nine years, Koum and Acton worked at Yahoo! together. In September 2007, they left and took a year off, traveling around South America and playing ultimate frisbee. Both applied to work at Facebook but were rejected.

In January 2009, Koum bought an iPhone and realized that the then seven-month-old App Store was about to spawn a whole new industry of apps. He visited his friend Alex Fishman, and they talked for hours about Koum's idea for an app. Koum almost immediately chose the name WhatsApp because it sounded like "what's up". A week later, on his 33rd birthday, he incorporated WhatsApp Inc. in California.

WhatsApp was initially unpopular, but its fortunes began to turn after Apple added push notification ability to apps in June 2009. Koum changed WhatsApp to "ping" users when they received a message, and soon afterward he and Fishman's Russian friends in the area began to use WhatsApp as a messaging tool, in place of SMS. The app gained a large user base, and Koum convinced Acton, then unemployed, to join the company. Koum granted Acton co-founder status after Acton managed to bring in $250,000 in seed funding.

On February 9, 2014, Zuckerberg asked Koum to have dinner at his home, and formally proposed Koum a deal to join the Facebook board. Ten days later Facebook announced that it was acquiring WhatsApp for US$19 billion. Over the first half of 2016, Koum sold more than $2.4 billion worth of Facebook stock, which was about half of his total holdings.

In April 2018, Koum announced that he was leaving WhatsApp and stepping down from Facebook's board of directors due to disputes with Facebook. It was originally thought that by leaving he was forfeiting his unvested stock, worth almost $1 billion. However, several months later it was discovered that he was still formally employed by Facebook, earning a reported $450 million in stock from the company through a method called "rest and vest".

Philanthropy
In 2014, Koum donated $1 million to The FreeBSD Foundation and close to $556 million to the Silicon Valley Community Foundation (SVCF). In 2016, The FreeBSD Foundation received another $500,000; further donations from the Koum Family Foundation included $750,000 in 2018 and $500,000 in 2019.

Koum also donated $2 million to AIPAC to support their involvement in the 2022 Democratic primaries.

Personal life
Koum is Jewish. He dislikes being called an entrepreneur and once tweeted, "Next person to call me an entrepreneur is getting punched in the face by my bodyguard." He feels that he is not an entrepreneur because entrepreneurs are motivated by the desire to make money, whereas he has said that he only wants to build useful products.

In February 1996, a restraining order was granted against Koum in state court in San Jose, California. An ex-girlfriend detailed incidents in which she said Koum verbally and physically threatened her. In October 2014, Koum said about the restraining order, "I am ashamed of the way I acted and ashamed that my behavior forced her to take legal action".

References

External links

1976 births
Living people
American billionaires
American computer businesspeople
American computer programmers
American people of Ukrainian-Jewish descent
American software engineers
American technology chief executives
American technology company founders
Businesspeople from the San Francisco Bay Area
Computer engineers
Directors of Facebook
Facebook employees
Ernst & Young people
Engineers from Kyiv
Engineers from California
People from Mountain View, California
San Jose State University alumni
Ukrainian emigrants to the United States
Ukrainian Jews
Yahoo! employees
21st-century Ukrainian engineers